The Church of St Mary the Virgin is a  Grade I listed church in Kensworth, Bedfordshire, England. It became a listed building on 3 February 1967.

See also
 Grade I listed buildings in Bedfordshire

References

Church of England church buildings in Bedfordshire
Grade I listed churches in Bedfordshire